Ganymed may refer to:
Ganymed (Goethe), a poem by Johann Wolfgang von Goethe

1036 Ganymed, asteroid
Ganymed (band), an Austrian/German space disco band founded in 1977

See also
Ganymede (disambiguation)